is a traditional drink from Amami Oshima and Okinawa Prefecture, areas known for health and longevity. It is an arrangement based on omiki, a beverage used in Shinto rituals and festivals. Miki is made from fermented rice, sweet potatoes, and sugar and was traditionally made in every household on the island.  It is sold commercially as a soft drink, with many specialized shops selling it, and some grocery stores.

History 
The origin of Miki can be traced back to "Kuchikamizake," an alcoholic beverage made by chewing rice or other grains and storing the saliva in a container. 

It is related to amazake but contains many more ingredients such as barley and lactic acid.

This type of drink was commonly made and offered during the annual "umachi" event in villages and gateways. Miki is written as "" in Chinese characters and has been recorded in historical accounts dating back to the 15th century. It was used in fertility festivals

With modernization, the traditional method of mouth-chewing the ingredients was abandoned and commercialized Miki is now made using rice, barley, and sugar. The addition of barley to rice is said to have originated in Itoman, where Miki has been made at the gates during the Umachi season. However, each region has developed its own sense of taste and variations in the Miki-making process still exist.

Description 
The main ingredients of Miki are rice, and sugar, and the drink is made by fermenting these ingredients, it contains sweet potatoes in Amami, and barley in Okinawa. The texture of the fermented rice resembles porridge, and the sweetness of the sweet potatoes and sugar added to it gives it a "sweet porridge" taste. The characteristic of store-bought Miki is that it has a flavor like sweet potato porridge, with a thick, sweet, and slightly sour taste. It has a sweet taste and a yogurt like texture It has a thick texture with pulp in it

It is not considered an alcoholic drink

Methods of consumption 
People typically drink Miki chilled, but it can also be mixed with ice, juice, milk, shochu, or wine. As it ferments, it becomes more sour, and some people prefer to drink it when it reaches a certain level of sourness. The shelf life of Miki is around 10 days from production, so it is best to drink it as soon as possible. In addition to drinking, Miki can also be used to make desserts such as dumplings with molasses or mixed with zenzai to make a Japanese-style dessert. It can also be added to fruit to make a yogurt-like dessert. 

It is said to help sick people recover.

References

See Also 

 Omiki
 Amazake
 Rice milk
 Sikhye

Rice drinks
Miyako culture
Okinawan cuisine
Soft drinks